The 2012 Players Championship was a golf tournament in Florida on the PGA Tour, held  at TPC Sawgrass in Ponte Vedra Beach, southeast of Jacksonville. It was the 39th Players Championship and was won by Matt Kuchar, two strokes ahead of four runners-up.

Defending champion K. J. Choi missed the 36-hole cut by seven strokes.

Venue

Course layout

Field
The field consisted of 144 players meeting criteria 1–12, plus the winner of the 2011 Senior Players Championship.

1. Winners of PGA Tour events since last Players
Keegan Bradley (2,3,5,9), K. J. Choi (2,3,6,9), Ben Crane (3,9), Ben Curtis, Luke Donald (2,3,7,9), Jason Dufner (2,3,9,11), Rickie Fowler (3,9), Harrison Frazar (3), Bill Haas (2,3,8,9), John Huh, Freddie Jacobson (2,3,9), Chris Kirk (3), Hunter Mahan (2,3,7,9,11), Rory McIlroy (5,9,11), George McNeill (3), Phil Mickelson (2,3,5,6,8,9,11), Bryce Molder (3), Kevin Na (3), Sean O'Hair (3), Carl Pettersson (3,9,11), Scott Piercy (3), Justin Rose (2,3,7,9,11), Adam Scott (2,3,7,9), Webb Simpson (2,3,9), Brandt Snedeker (2,3,9), Scott Stallings (3), Kyle Stanley (3,11), Steve Stricker (2,3,9), David Toms (2,3,9), Johnson Wagner (3,11), Nick Watney (2,3,7,9), Mark Wilson (2,3,9,11), Tiger Woods (5,7,9)
Darren Clarke (5) and Dustin Johnson (2,3,9) did not play.

2. Top 30 from previous season's FedEx Cup points list
Aaron Baddeley (3,9), Jonathan Byrd (3), Jason Day (3,9), Charles Howell III (3), Matt Kuchar (3,9), Geoff Ogilvy (3), Chez Reavie (3), John Senden (3,9), Vijay Singh (3), Bo Van Pelt (3,9), Gary Woodland (3), Yang Yong-eun (3,5)

3. Top 125 from previous season's PGA Tour money list
Blake Adams, Robert Allenby, Arjun Atwal, Briny Baird, Ricky Barnes, Matt Bettencourt, Kris Blanks, Michael Bradley, Chad Campbell, Greg Chalmers, Kevin Chappell, Stewart Cink (5), Chris Couch, Brian Davis, Brendon de Jonge, Chris DiMarco, James Driscoll, Ernie Els (7,9), Jim Furyk (8,9), Tommy Gainey, Sergio García (6,9), Robert Garrigus, Brian Gay, Tom Gillis, Lucas Glover (5), Retief Goosen, Hunter Haas, Pádraig Harrington (5), David Hearn, J. J. Henry, Tim Herron, Charley Hoffman, J. B. Holmes, Ryuji Imada, Trevor Immelman (5), Brandt Jobe, Zach Johnson (9), Kang Sung-hoon, Robert Karlsson (9), Jerry Kelly, Martin Laird (9), Marc Leishman, Justin Leonard, Spencer Levin, Davis Love III, David Mathis, Troy Matteson, Billy Mayfair, Graeme McDowell (5,9), John Merrick, Ryan Moore, Joe Ogilvie, Nick O'Hern, Louis Oosthuizen (5,9), Jeff Overton, Ryan Palmer, Rod Pampling, Pat Perez, Tom Pernice Jr., Ian Poulter (7,9), John Rollins, Andrés Romero, Rory Sabbatini, Heath Slocum, Kevin Stadler, Brendan Steele, Kevin Streelman, Chris Stroud, Josh Teater, Michael Thompson, D. J. Trahan, Cameron Tringale, Jhonattan Vegas, Scott Verplank, Camilo Villegas, Jimmy Walker, Charlie Wi
Paul Goydos, Anthony Kim, Steve Marino, D. A. Points, Charl Schwartzel (5,9), and Bubba Watson (2,3,5,9,11) did not play.

4. Top 125 from current season - Medical Extension
Bob Estes

5. Major champions from the past five years
Ángel Cabrera, Martin Kaymer (9)

6. Players Championship winners from the past five years
Tim Clark, Henrik Stenson

7. WGC winners from the past three years (WGC-HSBC Champions winners only from 2010–11, and only if PGA Tour members)

8. The Tour Championship winners from the past three years

9. Top 50 from the Official World Golf Ranking as of April 29
Bae Sang-moon, Paul Casey, Simon Dyson, Peter Hanson, Francesco Molinari, Álvaro Quirós, Lee Westwood
Thomas Bjørn, Anders Hansen, Kim Kyung-tae, and Paul Lawrie did not play.

10. Nationwide Tour money leader from prior season
J. J. Killeen

11. Top 10 current year FedEx Cup points leaders as of April 29

12. Field filled to 144 through current year FedEx Cup standings as of April 29
Bud Cauley, Graham DeLaet, Ken Duke, Harris English, Matt Every, Brian Harman, Colt Knost, Jeff Maggert, John Mallinger

13. Senior Players champion from prior year (did not count against field of 144)
Fred Couples did not play; therefore only 144 players competed.

Nationalities in the field

Round summaries

First round 
Thursday, May 10, 2012

Second round 
Friday, May 11, 2012

Third round 
Saturday, May 12, 2012

Final round 
Sunday, May 13, 2012

Scorecard
Final round

Cumulative tournament scores, relative to par
{|class="wikitable" span = 50 style="font-size:85%;
|-
|style="background: Red;" width=10|
|Eagle
|style="background: Pink;" width=10|
|Birdie
|style="background: PaleGreen;" width=10|
|Bogey
|style="background: Green;" width=10|
|Double bogey
|}
Source:

References

External links
The Players Championship website

2012
2012 in golf
2012 in American sports
2012 in sports in Florida
May 2012 sports events in the United States